Harlan Andrew Romanoff (born August 24, 1966) is an American politician, attorney, and academic. A Democrat, he was a member of the Colorado House of Representatives from 2001 to 2009, serving as Speaker from 2005 to 2009. He was a candidate for the United States Senate in the 2010 election, when he was defeated by incumbent Democrat Michael Bennet in the primary. Romanoff was a candidate for Colorado's 6th congressional district in 2014, losing to incumbent Republican Mike Coffman. He ran for the Democratic nomination in the 2020 United States Senate election in Colorado, losing to former Governor John Hickenlooper.

Early life and education
Romanoff was raised in Columbus, Ohio and graduated from Columbus Academy. His mother, a Democrat, was a social worker. His father, a Republican, was a prosecutor. Romanoff has a twin sister. Romanoff is Jewish.

Romanoff earned a bachelor's degree from Yale University. He took time off from Yale to work at the Southern Poverty Law Center, where he researched the Ku Klux Klan. He also worked at the Massachusetts Commission Against Discrimination and taught English in Nicaragua and Costa Rica. During his time in Nicaragua, his political philosophy was shaped by reading A Theory of Justice by liberal philosopher John Rawls.

Romanoff obtained a Master's degree in public policy from John F. Kennedy School of Government at Harvard University. Prior to earning a J.D. degree from the University of Denver Sturm College of Law, Romanoff worked for Democratic Congressman David Skaggs.

Career
From 1993 to 1997, Romanoff worked as a senior associate at the consulting firm of Greenberg Baron Simon & Miller. Romanoff served as a senior policy advisor to Governor Roy Romer from 1997 to 1999.
 
Romanoff has taught government at the University of Colorado Denver (1999), the Community College of Denver (1996–2005), Metropolitan State College of Denver (1996-2005), and Red Rocks Community College (1996–2005).

Romanoff has been a senior advisor with International Development Enterprises since 2010.

Colorado House of Representatives
Romanoff was a member of the Colorado House of Representatives from 2000 to 2008, winning reelection three times. He became Speaker of the House in 2005, and at the time was the youngest speaker in Colorado House history. Before becoming speaker he was the House Minority Leader, representing House District 6. Many considered Romanoff a possible Democratic candidate for governor of Colorado in 2006, but he announced in late 2005 that he would not run. He left the Colorado House after 2008 due to term limits.

In 2010, members of the Colorado Latino Forum criticized Romanoff in a Denver Post op-ed for his support of legislation affecting immigrants, including one law that “denied basic government services to individuals who couldn’t immediately prove they were legal residents.”

2010 U.S. Senate election

In early 2009, U.S. Senator Ken Salazar was nominated and confirmed as United States Secretary of the Interior. Romanoff was on a short list of possible candidates for appointment to Salazar's seat, but Governor Bill Ritter chose Denver schools' superintendent Michael Bennet. Romanoff opted to challenge Bennet for the Senate seat in the Democratic primary.

The Washington Post'''' reported, "Many Democrats here and in Washington think Romanoff decided to challenge Bennet purely out of pique, resentful that Gov. Bill Ritter (D) did not appoint him to the Senate seat left vacant when Obama named former senator Ken Salazar interior secretary."

Romanoff made campaign finance and ethics a key issue of his campaign, declining to take Political Action Committee (PAC) money for his Senate campaign. He had taken PAC money as a member of the Colorado legislature.

A preference poll taken March 16 at precinct caucuses showed Romanoff with 51 percent support, Bennet with 42 percent, and the remaining uncommitted. Delegates at each stage of the Democratic caucus-assembly process are not pledged to a candidate but are selected based on candidate preference.

Romanoff defeated Bennet in the Democratic State Assembly, with 60.4% of the vote to Bennet's 39.6%, thereby earning the first spot on the August primary ballot.

On September 16, 2009, Romanoff officially announced his campaign to challenge Bennet for the 2010 Democratic Senate nomination. Bill Clinton endorsed him on June 29, 2010. President Barack Obama endorsed Bennet shortly after Romanoff announced his candidacy.

On August 10, 2010, Romanoff was defeated by Bennet in the Democratic primary.

Job offer from the Obama administration
On September 27, 2009, Michael Riley of the Denver Post reported that Romanoff had been offered a position in the Obama administration in exchange for not running for U.S. Senate against Michael Bennet. According to Riley, Obama's deputy Chief of Staff Jim Messina called Romanoff to offer him various positions in the administration, including a position at the United States Agency for International Development. Romanoff turned down the offer.

On June 2, 2010, Romanoff issued a statement confirming that Messina had contacted him on September 11, 2009, and told him that Obama was going to support Bennet in the Democratic Party primary. Romanoff told Messina that he would run anyway; Messina "suggested three positions that might be available to me were I not pursuing the Senate race. He added that he could not guarantee my appointment to any of these positions." White House deputy press secretary Bill Burton told The Washington Post, "Mr. Romanoff was recommended to the White House from Democrats in Colorado for a position in the administration. There were some initial conversations with him, but no job was ever offered." Messina sent Romanoff job descriptions for three positions: an administrator for the Latin America and Caribbean Bureau within USAID, the chief of the Office of Democracy and Governance within USAID, and the director of the U.S. Trade and Development Agency.

On June 10, 2010, KDVR reported that Bennet said he had known about the White House's offer to Romanoff.

 2014 U.S. House election

Romanoff ran for the United States House of Representatives from Colorado's 6th congressional district in 2014. He lost to incumbent Republican Mike Coffman, 42.99% to 51.90%. Romanoff had relocated to Aurora, Colorado, in the 6th district, in 2013 to establish residency for his 2014 campaign. The district became significantly more hospitable to Democratic candidates after 2011, when it was redrawn to include nearly as many Democratic and unaffiliated voters as Republican voters.

In May 2014 Howard Dean endorsed Romanoff and spoke at one of his campaign fundraising events. Despite committing to reject contributions from political action committees and special interest groups, the Colorado Observer reported in August 2013 that Romanoff had received a plurality of his second-quarter fundraising from the legal industry.

On October 8, 2014, the Aurora Sentinel endorsed Romanoff. On October 10, Politico'' reported that national Democrats were canceling more than a $1 million in campaign ads in support of Romanoff, "a sign of waning confidence in his prospects."

2020 U.S. Senate election

On February 7, 2019, Romanoff announced his candidacy to challenge incumbent Republican Senator Cory Gardner in the 2020 election. He won the statewide caucuses with 86% of the vote but was defeated by former Governor John Hickenlooper in the Democratic primary.

Political positions
A political progressive, Romanoff has advocated for a Green New Deal and Medicare for All. Romanoff has stated his support for the Affordable Care Act. He has declined to give his position on the Keystone Pipeline until a delayed State Department review is complete.

See also
Colorado House of Representatives
Colorado General Assembly

References

External links

Andrew Romanoff for U.S. Senate campaign website 
 
 
 
2010 Campaign contributions at OpenSecrets.org

|-

1966 births
2006 Colorado gubernatorial election
Harvard Kennedy School alumni
Living people
Politicians from Columbus, Ohio
Politicians from Denver
Speakers of the Colorado House of Representatives
Democratic Party members of the Colorado House of Representatives
Sturm College of Law alumni
Yale University alumni
Jewish American state legislators in Colorado
Candidates in the 2020 United States Senate elections
21st-century American Jews